Pankaj Bandyopadhyay was an Indian politician and marine engineer belonging to All India Trinamool Congress. He was elected as MLA of Tollyganj Vidhan Sabha Constituency in West Bengal Legislative Assembly in 1972, 1996 and 2001. He served as Leader of the Opposition of West Bengal Legislative Assembly from 2001 to 2006.

Bandyopadhyay was married to Aparna Bandyopadhyay. Pragga Bandyopadhyay is their only daughter.

Bandyopadhyay died on 26 October 2018 at the age of 73.

References

2018 deaths
Trinamool Congress politicians from West Bengal
West Bengal MLAs 1972–1977
West Bengal MLAs 1996–2001
West Bengal MLAs 2001–2006
Leaders of the Opposition in West Bengal
Indian engineers
1945 births